Prince Thomas Emmanuel of Savoy, (8 December 1687 – 28 December 1729), was born a Prince of Savoy and was later Count of Soissons from 1702 till his death.

Early life 
He was the son of Prince Louis Thomas of Savoy (1657–1702) and Uranie de La Cropte. The famous general Prince Eugene of Savoy was his uncle.

Marriage 
He married on 24 October 1713 Princess Maria Theresia of Liechtenstein (1694–1772), Duchess of Troppau and had one son. He became a Knight in the Austrian Order of the Golden Fleece in 1712. He died in Vienna.

Issue

Eugène-Jean-François de Savoie (Eugene John Francis; 23 September 1714 – 24 November 1734); married Maria Teresa Cybo-Malaspina by proxy, but died 13 days after without issue.

Ancestry

References

Thomas Emmanuel of Savoy
Italian nobility
Counts of Soissons
1687 births
1729 deaths
Knights of the Golden Fleece of Austria
Burials at St. Stephen's Cathedral, Vienna